Christodoulos served as Greek Patriarch of Alexandria between 907 and 932.

References
 

10th-century Patriarchs of Alexandria